Football is the most popular sport, both in terms of participants and spectators, in London. London has several of England's leading football clubs, and the city is home to seventeen professional clubs, several dozen semi-professional clubs and several hundred amateur clubs regulated by the London Football Association, Middlesex County Football Association, Surrey County Football Association and the Amateur Football Alliance. Most London clubs are named after the district in which they play (or used to play), and share rivalries with each other.

London teams have won a total of 21 English Championships, 35 FA Cups, 12 EFL Cups, 8 Community Shields, 5 Football League Championships after Premier League was started, one Club World Cup, two Champions Leagues, five Cup Winners' Cups, four UEFA Cups/Europa Leagues, one Inter-Cities Fairs Cup, two Super Cups, and two Intertoto Cups. In the 1989–90 season, eight of London's professional clubs were in the top tier of English Football at the same time, meaning that 40% of the member clubs of the First Division that season were based in one city.

Introduction

Fulham were founded in 1879 and are London's oldest club still playing professionally. Royal Arsenal were London's first team to turn professional in 1891. They became Woolwich Arsenal in 1893, and then became just Arsenal in 1913. They are London's most successful team with 44 honours. Arsenal are only the second English club (after Preston North End of 1888–89), and the only London club to go an entire League season unbeaten, in the 2003–04 season. Arsenal have won The FA Cup a record 14 times; they were the first London team to win the Football League First Division in the 1930–31 season and the first London club to win the Premier League in the 1997–98 season. They were also the first London club to reach the European Cup/UEFA Champions League final, which they did in the 2005–06 season, eventually losing 1–2 to Barcelona.

Chelsea are the only London club to win the UEFA Champions League, securing two titles in both 2012 and 2021. On 15 May 2013, Chelsea won the UEFA Europa League to become the fourth club and the first British side to win all three main UEFA club competitions. Chelsea are also the only London club to have participated in and win the FIFA Club World Cup in 2021, beating Palmeiras in the final. Previously, they were runners-up in 2012, losing to Corinthians.

Tottenham Hotspur were the first British club to win a European trophy, winning the Cup Winners Cup in 1963. Arsenal, Chelsea and Tottenham Hotspur are traditionally London's most successful teams. Between them, they have won a total of 103 titles and trophies. Wembley Stadium, England's national stadium, is in London. The site of the 1966 World Cup Final and numerous European cup finals, it is the home venue of the England national football team and has traditionally hosted the FA Cup Final since 1923.

History
The playing of team ball games (almost certainly including football) was first recorded in London by William FitzStephen around 1174–1183. He described the activities of London youths during the annual festival of Shrove Tuesday.
"After lunch all of the city's youth would go out into the fields to take part in a ball game. The students of each school have their own ball; the workers from each city craft are also carrying their balls. Older citizens, fathers, and the wealthy would come on horseback to watch their juniors competing, and to relive their own youth vicariously: you can see their inner passions aroused as they watch the action and get caught up in the fun being had by the carefree adolescents."

Regular references to the game occurred throughout the fourteenth and fifteenth centuries, including the first reference to the word "football" in English when it was outlawed by King Henry IV of England in 1409.  Early games were probably disorganised and violent.  In the sixteenth century, the headmaster of St Paul's School Richard Mulcaster is credited with taking mob football and transforming it into organised and refereed team football.  In 1581 he wrote about his game of football, which included smaller teams, referees, set positions and even a coach.

The modern game of football was first codified in 1863 in London and subsequently spread worldwide.  Key to the establishment of the modern game was Londoner Ebenezer Cobb Morley who was a founding member of the Football Association, the oldest football organisation in the world.  Morley wrote to the Bell's Life newspaper proposing a governing body for football which led directly to the first meeting at the Freemasons' Tavern in central London of the FA. He wrote the first set of rules of true modern football at his house in Barnes.  The modern passing form of the game was invented in London in the early 1870s by the Royal Engineers A.F.C. (albeit the club were based in Chatham, Kent).

Prior to the first meeting of the Football Association in the Freemasons' Tavern in Great Queen Street, London on 26 October 1863, there were no universally accepted rules for the playing of the game of football. The founder members present at the first meeting were Barnes, Civil Service, Crusaders, Forest of Leytonstone (later to become Wanderers), N.N. (No Names) Club (Kilburn), the original Crystal Palace, Blackheath, Kensington School, Percival House (Blackheath), Surbiton and Blackheath Proprietary School; Charterhouse sent its captain, B.F. Hartshorne, but declined the offer to join. All of the 12 founding clubs were from London though many are since defunct or now play rugby union.

A rise in the popularity of football in London dates from the end of the 19th century, when a fall in church attendance left many people searching for a way to spend their weekend leisure time. In 1882 the London Football Association was set up. Over the next 25 years clubs sprang up all over the capital, and the majority of these teams are still thriving in the 21st century. Of those clubs currently playing in the Football League, Fulham is generally considered to be London's oldest, having been founded in 1879. However, Isthmian League side Cray Wanderers is the oldest extant club in all of the Greater London area, having been founded in 1860 in St Mary Cray | (then part of Kent but now in the London Borough of Bromley).

Initially, football in London was dominated by amateur teams, drawing their membership from former public schoolboys but gradually working-class sides came to the forefront. Royal Arsenal was London's first professional team, becoming so in 1891, a move which saw them boycotted by the amateur London Football Association. Other London clubs soon followed Arsenal's footsteps in turning professional, including Millwall (1893), Tottenham Hotspur (1895), Fulham (1898) and West Ham (1898).

In the meantime, Woolwich Arsenal (formerly Royal Arsenal) went on to be the first London club to join the Football League, in 1893. The following year, the Southern League was founded and many of its members would go on to join the Football League. In 1901 Tottenham Hotspur became the first club from London to win the FA Cup in the professional era, although it would not be until 1931 that a London side would win the Football League, the team in question being Arsenal (having moved to Highbury in 1913 and dropping the "Woolwich" from their name).

In the 1989–90 season, eight of London's professional clubs were in the top tier of English Football at the same time, forming 40% of the First Division that season.

Historically, London clubs have not accumulated as many trophies as those from North West England, such as the 52 top-league English championships won by Liverpool, Manchester United, Everton and Manchester City; however, in the thirteen consecutive seasons since 2005–06, Arsenal, Chelsea, and Tottenham have consistently finished in the top six of the league table (92% top six finishes, after accounting for a Tottenham 8th, a Chelsea 10th and a Tottenham 11th) and are regarded as three of the Premier League's current "big six" alongside Liverpool, Manchester United, and Manchester City. In the two seasons immediately proceeding the start of this top six run, Arsenal and Chelsea became the first pair of London clubs to finish first and second in the top flight, with Arsenal winning in 2003–04, and Chelsea winning in 2004–05. The 2009–10 season saw Chelsea (1st), Arsenal (3rd) and Tottenham (4th) all finish in the top four, qualifying all three of these London teams into the same UEFA Champions League competition.

Before the 1996–97 season, when Chelsea started its run of consistent high finishes, the two highest profile London clubs were Arsenal and their long-standing North London rivals Tottenham Hotspur, both of whom were considered to be members of English football's "big five" (with Manchester United, Liverpool and Everton) for much of the post-war period. As of the end of the 2021–22 season, all three clubs were in the top ten in the all-time top-flight table for England – Arsenal at second overall, Tottenham at seventh overall and Chelsea at eighth overall.

Clubs

The table below lists all London clubs in the top eight tiers of the English football league system: from the top division (the Premier League), down to Step 4 of the National League System. League status is correct for the 2022–23 season.

Below the eighth tier, numerous London clubs are represented within the Combined Counties League (SW), Essex Senior League (NE), Southern Counties East Football League (SE) and the Spartan South Midlands League (NW).

Defunct clubs 

There are also a huge number of minor London clubs playing outside the top eight levels of English football. Hackney Marshes in east London, home to many amateur sides, is reportedly the single largest collection of football pitches in the world, with 100 separate pitches.

Most successful clubs overall (1871 – present)

The figures in bold represent the most times this competition has been won by an English team.
Shared Community Shield results listed as wins.
 * The Inter-Cities Fairs Cup is not considered a UEFA competition, and hence Arsenal's record in the Fairs Cup is not considered part of its European record (although they won it in 1970, at a time when participation was based on league position).

Domestic honours

English football champions
Titles (clubs): 21 (3)
Runners-up (clubs): 19 (5)

Outside of those five, the highest league positions of London clubs which have played in the top-flight are 3rd (Crystal Palace, West Ham United), 5th (Brentford), 6th (Wimbledon), 7th (Fulham), 10th (Millwall), and 22nd (Leyton Orient).

FA Cup
There have been seven all-London FA Cup finals the first being in 1967 between Tottenham Hotspur and Chelsea. Arsenal have three all-London affairs, Spurs and West Ham both two. Chelsea have featured in four (a joint record with Arsenal) losing all four.   

Titles (clubs): 41 (8)
Runners-up (clubs): 24 (10)

EFL Cup

Titles (clubs): 12 (4)
Runners-up (clubs): 18 (5)

FA Community Shield

Titles (clubs): 27 (4)
Runners-up (clubs): 24 (7)

Second Division / Championship (Tier 2)
Titles (clubs): 16 (9)
Runners-up (clubs): 18 (9)

London football in Europe
Titles (clubs): 14 (5)
Runners-up (clubs): 8 (6)

UEFA Champions League
Titles (clubs): 2 (1)
Runners-up (clubs): 3 (3)

UEFA Cup Winners' Cup
Titles (clubs): 5 (4)
Runners-up (clubs): 3 (2)

UEFA Cup and UEFA Europa League
Titles (clubs): 4 (2)
Runners-up (clubs): 4 (3)

Inter-Cities Fairs Cup
Titles (clubs): 1 (1)
Runners-up (clubs): 1 (1)

UEFA Super Cup
Titles (clubs): 2 (1)
Runners-up (clubs): 4 (2)

UEFA Intertoto Cup
Titles (clubs): 2 (2)

London football in FIFA Club World Cup
Titles (clubs): 1 (1)
Runners-up (clubs): 1 (1)

London derbies

Stadium

Wembley Stadium

Wembley Stadium, in north-west London, is the national football stadium, and is traditionally the home of the FA Cup Final as well as England's home internationals. The old stadium was closed in 2000 in order to be demolished and completely rebuilt, and reopened in 2007; during the closure Cardiff's Millennium Stadium was the venue for cup finals, while England played at various venues around the country. Wembley was one of the venues for the 1966 FIFA World Cup and the 1996 European Football Championship, and hosted the final of both tournaments. It also was the venue for the European Cup final in 1968, 1978, 1992, 2011 and 2013. With a 90,000-capacity, it is the second largest stadium in Europe.

Other stadiums

Most clubs in London have their own stadium, although some clubs share, and some clubs may temporarily take up a tenancy at another's ground due to their own ground being redeveloped. The largest operational football stadium in London apart from Wembley is Tottenham Hotspur Stadium, with a capacity of 62,062. Other large stadiums include Arsenal's Emirates Stadium (60,704), West Ham United's London Stadium (60,000) and Chelsea's Stamford Bridge (41,798). There are 10 stadiums in London (apart from Wembley) with capacities over 18,000.

Administration

London is the location of the headquarters of the Football Association, at Wembley Stadium (formerly Soho Square and Lancaster Gate), while the Premier League's offices are located in Marylebone. The Football League maintains its headquarters in Preston, although its commercial offices are based in Marylebone as well.

See also

Sport in London
Football in England
List of football clubs in England by competitive honours won

Notes

References

 
History of football in England